Kong Korm (born 6 April 1941) is a Cambodian politician and Senator. He was formerly a member of the Sam Rainsy Party and formerly served as its leader after Sam Rainsy resigned to lead the Cambodia National Rescue Party. He was formerly a member of the Cambodian People's Party and served as foreign minister from 1986 to 1987.

In 2019, Kong Korm was named as the honorary president of the Khmer Will Party.

References

1941 births
Living people
Cambodian Buddhists
People from Kampong Cham province
Candlelight Party politicians
Cambodian People's Party politicians
Government ministers of Cambodia
Foreign ministers of Cambodia